In early July 1911, during the silent era of motion pictures, at David Horsley's Nestor Comedies in Bayonne, New Jersey, Al Christie began turning out a weekly one-reel live-action Mutt and Jeff comedy short, which was based on the comic strip. The series lasted 2 years ending in 1913. Approximately 59 shorts were produced. Below is a list of the films separated by years.

1911
 Mutt and Jeff Break Into Society 
 Mutt and Jeff Make the Feathers Fly 
 Mutt and Jeff's Scheme That Failed 
 Mutt and Jeff and the Unlucky Star 
 Mutt and Jeff and the Lady Stenographer 
 Mutt and Jeff Discover a Wonderful Remedy 
 Mutt and Jeff Join the Opera Co
 Mutt and Jeff and the Blackhand
 Mutt and Jeff Spend a Quiet Day in the Country 
 Mutt and Jeff as Reporters 
 Mutt and Jeff and the Dog Catchers 
 Mutt and Jeff and the Newsboys 
 Mutt and Jeff and the Escaped Lunatic 
 Mutt and Jeff and the German Band 
 Mutt and Jeff and the Country Judge 
 Mutt and Jeff in the Banking Business 
 Mutt and Jeff and the Goldstein Burglary 
 Mutt and Jeff Get Passes to the Ball Game 
 Mutt and Jeff Make a Hit 
 Mutt and Jeff at the Fortune Teller's 
 Mutt and Jeff in a Matrimonial Affair 
 Mutt and Jeff on the Job

1912
 Mutt and Jeff Fall in Love 
 Mutt and Jeff and Italian Strikers

1913
 Mutt and Jeff (unknown title)
 Whaddaya Mean You're Contended 
 Mutt and Jeff (unknown title)
 Mutt and Jeff (unknown title)
 Mutt and Jeff (unknown title)
 Mutt and Jeff (unknown title)
 Mutt and Jeff (unknown title)
 Mutt and Jeff (unknown title)
 The Mexican Problem 
 The Hypnotist 
 Mutt and Jeff (unknown title)
 A Substitute for Peroxide 
 Johnny Reb's Wooden Leg 
 Mutt's Marriage 
 Mutt and Jeff (unknown title)
 The Ball Game 
 The Merry Milkmaid 
 The California Alien Land Law 
 Baseball 
 Mutt and Jeff (unknown title)
 Pickaninni's G-string 
 Mutt and Jeff (unknown title)
 Mutt and Jeff (unknown title)
 Mutt Puts One Over 
 The Sandstorm 
 Mutt and Jeff in Mexico 
 The Sultan's Harem 
 Mutt's Moneymaking Scheme 
 Mutt and Jeff in Turkey 
 The Matrimonial Agency 
 Mutt and Jeff in Constantinople 
 Mutt and Jeff at Sea 
 Mutt and Jeff at Sea: Part 2 
 Mutt and Jeff (unknown title)
 Mutt and Jeff (unknown title)
 Mutt and Jeff (unknown title)

References

See also
 Mutt and Jeff animated filmography

Film series introduced in 1911
Mutt and Jeff
Male actor filmographies
Live-action films based on comics